House at 107 Stroud Street is a historic home located at Canastota in Madison County, New York.  It was built about 1875 and displays elements of the Italianate and Eastlake styles.  It is a two-story cubic massed structure surmounted by a low-pitched, hipped roof with a central cross gable.

It was added to the National Register of Historic Places in 1986.

References

Houses on the National Register of Historic Places in New York (state)
Italianate architecture in New York (state)
Houses completed in 1875
Houses in Madison County, New York
National Register of Historic Places in Madison County, New York